The Sackville River is a river in Hants County and  Halifax Regional Municipality, Nova Scotia, Canada. It empties into Bedford Basin. The Little Sackville River is a tributary.

Tributaries
Little Sackville River
Tomahawk Run
Peverill's Brook

Lakes
McCabe Lake
Webber Lake

Communities
Mount Uniacke
Lower Sackville
Middle Sackville
Upper Sackville
Bedford
Hammonds Plains
Beaverbank

See also
List of rivers of Nova Scotia

References

External links
Sackville Rivers Association

Rivers of Nova Scotia
Landforms of Hants County, Nova Scotia
Landforms of Halifax, Nova Scotia
Landforms of Halifax County, Nova Scotia